Chuck FM may refer to the following radio stations:

WFZZ, Green Bay, Wisconsin
WAVF, Hanahan, South Carolina
Former branding of W258CB, Greenville, South Carolina
WXKT, Gainesville, GA